The Twelfth Army was a British Army formation during the Second World War. The Twelfth Army denotation was actually used twice; firstly, in 1943, for a fictional formation and secondly, in 1945, in Burma.

The Twelfth Army moniker was originally used by Advanced Headquarters 'A' Force, a Cairo-based deception department created by Dudley Clarke, for a formation used in Operation Barclay and Operation Zeppelin. It was later used for a real formation in Burma, which took over operations from the Fourteenth Army and would later become Burma Command.

1943: Middle East

A British Twelfth Army was initially invented by 'A' Force as part as the deception plan for Operation Husky, the Allied invasion of Sicily in July 1943. The Western Allies attempted to convince the Germans that their main effort during 1943 would be to land the Twelfth Army in Greece and then advance into the eastern Balkans during the early part of the summer of 1943 with the aim of bringing Turkey into the war and then linking up with the Soviet Red Army. The deception plan attempted to convince the Germans that this army had twelve divisions under its control and was located in Egypt. The army's formation insignia was a trained seal balancing on its nose a terrestrial globe showing the Eastern Hemisphere, black on a white background. The insignia was supposed to symbolize an amphibious creature treating the whole world as its own.

Subordinate units

Between 1943 and 1945, when it was disbanded to allow the formation of the second British Twelfth Army,  its nominal existence was used to create the impression of a standing threat to the Balkans. During this period the units shown under its control varied, depending on the target chosen. The following list includes all units mentioned as forming part of the Twelfth Army or its component corps.

Corps
 British III Corps (fictional)
 British XIV Corps (fictional)
British XVI Corps (fictional)
Polish III Corps (fictional)

Divisions
 Polish 2nd Armored Division
  British 4th Airborne Division (fictional)
  British 5th Airborne Division (fictional)
  British 5th Infantry Division
 Polish 7th Infantry Division
  British 8th Armored Division (fictional)
 Polish 8th Infantry Division (fictional)
  British 15th Motorized Division (fictional)
  British 33rd Infantry Division (fictional)
  British 34th Infantry Division (fictional)
  British 40th Infantry Division (fictional)
  British 42nd Infantry Division (fictional)
  British 56th Infantry Division
  British 57th Infantry Division (fictional)

1945: Burma

The second British Twelfth Army was formed on 28 May 1945, to take control of operations in Burma from the Fourteenth Army, which was being withdrawn to plan for Operation Zipper, the planned invasion of Malaya by amphibious assault, which was due to take place in August 1945.

The army HQ was created by re-designating the HQ of the Indian XXXIII Corps, under Lieutenant-General Sir Montagu Stopford. It took over one of the Fourteenth Army's main combat formations, IV Corps which was temporarily commanded by Lieutenant-General Francis Tuker, with 5th, 17th and 19th Indian Divisions and 255th Indian Tank Brigade under its command. Twelfth Army assumed direct command of 7th and 20th Indian Divisions, together with 22nd East African Brigade. Static formations under its control included 505 District and South Burma District.

There were still Japanese formations in Burma at this time, with IV Corps having the responsibility for driving them out of the remainder of the country. The Japanese tried to break out from the Allied armies closing in on them, and although suffering heavy casualties, did succeed in rescuing some of their formations.

After the war, Twelfth Army continued in existence until 1 November, when it was re designated Burma Command.

The formation insignia was a Chinthe on a red background, with a superimposed horizontal black stripe on which was written "XII" in white letters.

Notes

References
 
 
 
 

Military units and formations established in 1943
Military units and formations disestablished in 1945
12
12
Fictional units of World War II
Military units and formations of the British Empire in World War II